Ola Bratteli (24 October 1946 – 8 February 2015) was a Norwegian mathematician.

He was a son of Trygve Bratteli and Randi Bratteli (née Larssen). He received a PhD degree in 1974. He was appointed as professor at the University of Trondheim in 1980 and at the University of Oslo in 1991. He was a member of the Norwegian Academy of Science and Letters.

Selected works
with Derek W. Robinson: Operator Algebras and Quantum Statistical Mechanics (Springer-Verlag, 2 volumes, 1980)
Derivations, Dissipations and Group Actions on C*-algebras (Springer-Verlag, 1986)
with Palle T. Jørgensen: Wavelets through a looking glass, the world of the spectrum (Birkhäuser, 2002)

See also
Approximately finite-dimensional C*-algebra
Bratteli diagram
Bratteli–Vershik diagram

References

1946 births
2015 deaths
Norwegian mathematicians
Academic staff of the Norwegian University of Science and Technology
Academic staff of the University of Oslo
Members of the Norwegian Academy of Science and Letters
Royal Norwegian Society of Sciences and Letters